The Peć District (Serbian: Пећки округ or Pećki okrug , also called Dukagjin or Regjioni i Pejës in Albanian) is a de jure district in Autonomous Province of Kosovo and Metohija. It is located in the west part of Metohija. 90% of its population of 414,187 is Albanian, but there are other ethnic groups such as Serbs, Roma, etc. Seat of the District is in the city of Peć.

Municipalities

It included the municipalities of:

Peć
Istok
Klina
Dečani
Đakovica

Culture and history
Peć is first mentioned in 1302, as Archiepiscopal seat of the Serbian Orthodox Church. The Patriarchal Monastery of Peć consists of a group of monasteries and has been the seat of the Serbian Archbishops and Patriarchs for centuries. It is famous for its monastic complex in Peć, the official residence of the Patriarchs of the Serbian Orthodox Church. 

The frescoes from the church of St. Apostles, dating from the thirteenth century, rank among the most remarkable medieval Serbian paintings. Over the centuries, churches and other buildings of the Peć Patriarchy have been destroyed and reconstructed several times. Today's appearance dates back to 1931-1932. The Visoki Dečani Monastery is one of the most grandiose monuments of the Serb medieval culture. It is the endowment of King Stefan Dečanski, built from 1327 to 1335.

Economy
The main activities in Peć District are leather and footwear, forestry,  industrial, agricultural-industrial, and a car spare-parts factory.

References

Note: All official material made by Government of Serbia is public by law. Information was taken from official website.

Districts in Kosovo and Metohija